Steve Stevens (born Steven Bruce Schneider; May 5, 1959) is an American guitarist. He is best known as Billy Idol's guitarist and songwriting collaborator, and for his lead guitar work on the theme to Top Gun – "Top Gun Anthem" – for which he won a Grammy in 1987: Best Pop Instrumental Performance. 

Stevens has played for Michael Jackson, Ric Ocasek, Robert Palmer, and many others. Stevens was in Vince Neil's band from 1992 to 1994, touring and recording on his album Exposed. Stevens was a founding member of the supergroup Bozzio Levin Stevens, which released Black Light Syndrome in 1997 and Situation Dangerous in 2000. He brought Spanish flamenco guitar stylings to the song "Pistolero" (1999) for the trance group Juno Reactor.  During 2012–2016, Stevens appeared with Kings of Chaos. His "Steve Stevens" group headlined the closing performance at the Musikmesse in Frankfurt, Germany, in April 2016. He is also a television personality on the E! show Married to Rock, alongside his wife, Josie Stevens.

Career 
His solo album releases include Atomic Playboys (1989), Flamenco a Go-Go (1999), and Memory Crash (2008).

Discography

Studio albums 
 The Guitar World According to Steve Stevens (1986 cassette from the music magazine Guitar World)
 Atomic Playboys (1989)
 Akai Guitar Sample Collection (1994)
 Flamenco a Go-Go (1999)
 Memory Crash (2008)

with Billy Idol 
 Billy Idol (1982)
 Rebel Yell (1983)
 Whiplash Smile (1986)
 Devil's Playground (2005)
 Kings & Queens of the Underground (2014)
 The Roadside (2021)
 The Cage (2022)

with Ric Ocasek 
 This Side of Paradise (1986)

with Jerusalem Slim 
 Jerusalem Slim (1992)

with Vince Neil 
 Exposed (1993)

with Bozzio Levin Stevens 
 Black Light Syndrome (1997)
 Situation Dangerous (2000)

with Kyosuke Himuro 
 I·De·A (1997)
 The One Night Stands Live (1998)
 Mellow (2000)
 Beat Haze Odyssey (2000)
 Follow the Wind (2003)

with Deadland Ritual 
 "Down in Flames" (2018)
 "Broken and Bruised" (2019)

Guest appearances

Soundtrack appearances

References

External links 

 Ram 1997 (text)
 From Rockaway to L.A. 2014 (text)

American heavy metal guitarists
1959 births
Living people
Musicians from Brooklyn
Vince Neil Band members
Grammy Award winners
Lead guitarists
American male songwriters
20th-century American Jews
Guitarists from New York (state)
20th-century American guitarists
21st-century American guitarists
Neurotic Outsiders members
Bozzio Levin Stevens members
American male guitarists
Jewish rock musicians
Magna Carta Records artists
20th-century American male musicians
21st-century American Jews